Yamanlar can refer to:

 Yamanlar, a mountain in Turkey
 Yamanlar, Çivril
 Yamanlar, Hınıs
 Yamanlar, Pınarbaşı, a village
 Yamanlar, Yeniçağa, a village